Paul Kihara Kariuki is a Kenyan lawyer and a former court of appeal president and judge. He was nominated for the post of Office of Attorney General of Kenya by President Uhuru Kenyatta on 13 February 2018 following the resignation of Githu Muigai.

Background and education
Paul Kihara Kariuki was born on 11, May 1954 in Kiambu, Kenya. His parents are the Late Bishop of Anglican Church, Bishop Obadiah Kariuki and Lillian Wairimu the daughter of Senior Chief Koinange. He attended Nairobi School and graduated from the University of Nairobi with a Bachelor of Laws degree in 1977.

Judicial career

Between 1977 and 1980 Kariuki was a legal assistant at Hamilton, Harrison, and Matthews in Nairobi and then a partner from 1981 to 1986.

In 1986 he established Ndungu Njoroge and Kwach Advocates with his partners where he practiced until 2000, then was appointed the director of Kenya School of Law, a position that had become vacant after the previous holder, Leonard Njagi, was appointed a High Court judge.

In October 2003, Kariuki was one of the judges appointed as judges of the High Court by President Kibaki. On appointment, Justice Kariuki became the duty judge at the High Court, replacing Justice Isaac Lenaola who had been appointed a member of the tribunal to investigate judges who chose to contest their removal from the bench. Justice Kariuki was to hold the position of duty judge for the next two years.

In 2006, Chief Justice Gicheru appointed an integrity review committee and appointed Kariuki to head this committee.

In 2009, the Chief Justice appointed Justice Kariuki to head the newly established Judicial Training Institute (JTI).

In 2012 Justice Kariuki was appointed as a Court of Appeal Judge and later appointed as President of the Court of appeal.

References

1954 births
Living people
Kenyan judges
Kenyan lawyers
University of Nairobi alumni
People from Kiambu County